Dhaka First Division Football League was the second tier football league in Bangladesh which was established in 1993 by the Bangladesh Football Federation. In 2007, with the introduction of Bangladesh's first wide open national league, the Bangladesh Premier League, the First Division League was shut down and merged to the previous top-tier, the Dhaka League, which was re-introduced as the new second-tier, called the Dhaka Senior Division Football League (currently the 3rd-tier).

History

In 1993, the Bangladesh Football Federation replaced the Dhaka Second Division Football League (which was the second-tier to the Dhaka League since they both started in 1948), with the Dhaka First Division Football League. The Dhaka League was renamed as the Dhaka Premier Division League, being the country's premier football competition, while the Second Division and Third Division served as the 3rd and 4th tier respectively.

In 2007, the league was shut down and merged to the top-tier, the Dhaka Premier Division League (Dhaka League), which was re-introduced as the Dhaka Senior Division Football League, the second-tier to the Bangladesh Premier League (and later became the third-tier in 2012 after the introduction of the Bangladesh Championship League). Thus, marking the end of the Dhaka First Division Football League's 14-years journey as the second-tier of Bangladeshi Football.

Champions

References

Defunct football leagues in Bangladesh
Sports leagues established in 1993
2006 disestablishments in Bangladesh